LMCC may refer to:

 Licentiate of the Medical Council of Canada
 Lower Manhattan Cultural Council
 Lake Macquarie City Council
 “Like, Mirror, Collect, Comment” an engagement movement on Lens Protocol